"You Can Have Him" is a popular song written by Irving Berlin for the 1949 musical Miss Liberty, where it was introduced by Allyn McLerie and Mary McCarty.

It is not to be confused with Roy Hamilton's 1961 hit "You Can Have Her", which has later been recorded by female singers using the title "You Can Have Him".

Notable recordings
Doris Day & Dinah Shore - recorded May 1, 1949 for Columbia Records (catalog No. 38514).
Ella Fitzgerald - Ella Fitzgerald Sings the Irving Berlin Songbook (1958)
Eydie Gorme - for her album Eydie (1968).
Nina Simone - included in the album Nina Simone at Town Hall (1959)
Nancy Wilson - Broadway – My Way (1964)
Shirley Bassey - for her album I've Got a Song for You (1966)

References 

Songs written by Irving Berlin
Songs from musicals
1949 songs
Nancy Wilson (jazz singer) songs